Expedition 18 was the 18th permanent crew of the International Space Station (ISS).
The first two crew members, Michael Fincke, and Yuri Lonchakov were launched on 12 October 2008, aboard Soyuz TMA-13. With them was astronaut Sandra Magnus, who joined the Expedition 18 crew after launching on STS-126 and remained until departing on STS-119 on 25 March 2009. She was replaced by JAXA astronaut Koichi Wakata, who arrived at the ISS on STS-119 on 17 March 2009. Gregory Chamitoff, who joined Expedition 18 after Expedition 17 left the station, ended his stay aboard ISS and returned to Earth with the STS-126 crew.

Crew

Crew notes
Salizhan Sharipov, was originally slated to be the Soyuz commander and Expedition 18 Flight Engineer 1, but was replaced by his back-up Yuri Lonchakov.<! -- Unless sourcing for "health concerns" is found, this needs to be left out.-->

Backup crew 
 Gennady Padalka – Commander – RSA (for Lonchakov)
 Michael Barratt- Flight Engineer – NASA (for Fincke)
 Timothy Kopra – Flight Engineer – NASA (for Chamitoff)
Nicole Stott – Flight Engineer – NASA (for Magnus)
 Soichi Noguchi – Flight Engineer – JAXA (for Wakata)

Mission plan
 Launch vehicle: Soyuz TMA-13
 Launch date: 12 October 2008 3:01 a.m. EDT
 Docking: 14 October 2008
 Spacewalks: 22 December 2008 (completed 23 December) and 10 March 2009
 Landing: 8 April 2009

March 2009 debris incident 
On 12 March 2009, a piece of debris from the upper stage of a Delta II rocket used to launch a GPS satellite in 1993, passed close to the ISS. The conjunction between the debris and the Space Station was not detected until it was too late to perform a collision avoidance manoeuvre. The crew prepared to evacuate the station by closing hatches between modules, and boarding the Soyuz spacecraft that was docked to provide emergency crew escape. The debris did not hit the station, instead it passed by at 16:38 UTC, and the crew were cleared to resume operations about five minutes later.

Extra-vehicular activity

See also 
 Apogee of Fear, a film made aboard the flight
 Extravehicular activity
 List of cumulative spacewalk records
 List of spacewalks 2000–2014

References

External links

NASA International Space Station page
NASA Expedition 18 page
Expedition 18 Photography

Expedition 18
2008 in spaceflight
2009 in spaceflight